The 31st Hong Kong Film Awards presentation ceremony took place in Hong Kong Cultural Centre on 15 April 2012. The hosts for the awards ceremony are Eric Tsang, Bowie Tsang, Gordon Lam, Ronald Cheng and Angelababy. TVB, Now TV and RTHK Radio 2 were the live broadcasters of the ceremony, with other networks airing simulcasts around the world.

The film A Simple Life won five of its major nominations (film, director, screenplay, actor, actress). Deanie Ip became the oldest Best Actress Award-winner in the history of Hong Kong Film Awards. Ann Hui has now won four Best Director Awards, the most in awards history.

Let the Bullets Fly directed by Jiang Wen and Flying Swords of Dragon Gate directed by Tsui Hark dominated the nominations in 13 categories, including Best Film and Best Director. Individually, Jiang Wen got nominated in four categories (director, actor, screenplay, film editing).

Awards
Winners are listed first, highlighted in boldface, and indicated with a double dagger.

Special awards

Presenters
Best Film
 Tony Leung Ka-fai
Best Director
 Peter Chan
Best Screenplay
 Kam Kwok-leung
Best Actor
 Sandra Ng
 Carina Lau
Best Actress
 Anthony Wong
Best Supporting Actor
 Andy Lau
Best Supporting Actress
 Shawn Yue
 Gao Yuanyuan
Best Cinematography, Best Film Editing
 Julian Cheung
 Shu Qi
Best Art Direction, Best Costume and Makeup Design
 Philip Chan
 John ShumBest Action Choreography Chin Kar-lok
 Kara HuiBest Sound Design, Best Visual Effects Pang Ho-cheung
 Yang MiBest Original Film Score, Best Original Film Song Coco LeeBest New Director Giddens Ko
 Michelle Chen
 Ko Cheng-tungBest New Performer Jim ChimBest Film of Mainland and Taiwan Hou Hsiao-hsien
 Ng See-yuen
 Li Siao-hungLifetime Achievement Award Tsui HarkProfessional Achievement Award Sammo Hung

Films with awards and nominations
These films has received one nomination or more at the awards:
 13 : Flying Swords of Dragon Gate, Let the Bullets Fly
 12 : Wu Xia
 9 : Overheard 2
 8 : A Simple Life, Life without Principle
 4 : Shaolin, White Vengeance
 3 : A Beautiful Life, Mural
 2 : Don’t Go Breaking My Heart, Hi, Fidelity, The Sorcerer and the White Snake
 1 : Cure, If You Are the One 2, Lan Kwai Fong, Magic to Win, Starry Starry Night, Big Blue Lake, The Flowers of War, The Killer Who Never Kills,  Seediq Bale, You Are the Apple of My Eye

Notea: Although Wu Xia receives 12 nominations, the categories it gets nominated are of acting or technical skills.b: A Simple Life gets nominated in all major categories (film, director, screenplay, actor, actress, supporting actor, supporting actress, cinematography).c''': The tagged films are from mainland China or Taiwan so they can compete for only 1 award (Best Film of Mainland and Taiwan).

References

External links
 Official website of the Hong Kong Film Awards

2012
2012 film awards
2012 in Hong Kong
Hong